Charles Henry Dryden (13 January 1860 – 1 July 1943) was a New Zealand cricketer who played first-class cricket for Wellington from 1885 to 1894.

Cricket career
Charles Dryden was a leg-spin bowler – "a wily slow bowler, great in a tight corner" – who achieved some impressive bowling figures for Wellington. 

His best match figures were 12 for 93 (7 for 58 and 5 for 35) in a loss to Canterbury in 1889–90, when Albert Moss took all ten Wellington wickets in the first innings. He twice took his best innings figures of 7 for 24: when Nelson needed 84 to win in 1886-87 he was mainly responsible for dismissing them for 70; and in 1893-94 he helped dismiss Auckland for 77.

Personal life
He worked as a building contractor in Wellington. He and his wife had a daughter and a son.

References

External links

1860 births
1943 deaths
New Zealand cricketers
Wellington cricketers
Cricketers from Wellington City